Kevin Dion Murphy (born September 8, 1963) is a former American football linebacker who played for the Tampa Bay Buccaneers, the San Diego Chargers and the Seattle Seahawks in the National Football League (NFL). He was converted from defensive lineman to linebacker in the NFL. Murphy was ranked 80th on the USA Today Sports Weekly list of the top 100 players in Buccaneers’ franchise history. Individuals chosen to be on the list were selected based on their overall positive contributions that they made during their playing career.

Murphy played college football for the Oklahoma Sooners. He was an All-Conference selection in 1982, 1983 and 1985 and an All-American in 1985. In a 247Sports article titled “Ranking Oklahoma’s 5 best football teams of all-time,” Murphy was favorably mentioned regarding his “All-American” season that he had while playing on ”Switzer’s third and final National Title team” in 1985.

References

1963 births
Living people
Sportspeople from Plano, Texas
American football linebackers
Oklahoma Sooners football players
Tampa Bay Buccaneers players
San Diego Chargers players
Seattle Seahawks players
Players of American football from Texas